Artemidora is a genus of moths in the family Geometridae.

Species
 Artemidora maracandaria (Erschoff, 1874)
 Artemidora metsaviiri Viidalepp, 1988
 Artemidora symmetrica Djakonov, 1923

References
 Artemidora at Markku Savela's Lepidoptera and Some Other Life Forms

Ourapterygini
Geometridae genera